Skin dimples (also known as "Skin fossa") are deep cutaneous depressions that are seen most commonly on the cheeks or chin, occurring in a familial pattern suggestive of autosomal dominant inheritance.

See also 
 Sinus pericranii
 List of cutaneous conditions

References 

Cutaneous congenital anomalies